Benwell and Scotswood is an electoral ward of Newcastle upon Tyne in North East England. The ward encompasses the Benwell and Scotswood housing areas, as well as the Newcastle Business Park, which is located on the banks of the River Tyne and houses offices of companies such as British Airways and the Automobile Association. The population of the ward is 13,759, which is 5.3% of the total population of Newcastle upon Tyne. Car ownership in the area is 45.1%, lower than the city average of 54.7%. The 2011 Census gave a population of 12,694.

History

Scotswood grew during the industrial revolution and provided labour for the huge Vickers Armstrong military engineering group formerly Armstrong Whitworth. Scotswood Road, which Vickers Armstrong used to dominate, is a main route along the Tyne and is mentioned in the song "Blaydon Races".

The Scotswood Bridge, which was known as the Chain Bridge, was the first bridge to be built over the Tyne in the industrial era.  It opened in 1831 and was in use until 1967 when it had been superseded by a more modern structure, and was hence demolished.

Benwell and Scotswood were both sites of a number of coalmines. On 30 March 1925 the Montague Main Colliery Disaster occurred, caused by an inrush of water from the nearby disused Paradise Pit and resulting in the loss of 38 lives.

Scotswood railway station was served by the Newcastle and Carlisle Railway between 1839 and 1967.

The Fenham and Benwell district formed an independent urban district, which was incorporated into the City of Newcastle upon Tyne in 1904.

The site came to attention in the summer of 1968 for being the scene where two male toddlers Martin Brown, aged 4, and Brian Howe, aged 3, were found dead, after being strangled to death by Mary Bell.

Boundaries
The boundary of the Benwell and Scotswood ward starts at the West Road/A1 roundabout southbound along the A1 to the River Tyne, then east to the Scotswood Road and William Armstrong Drive junction. Northbound, the boundary joins Buddle Road and continues along St Johns Road to Elswick Road. The boundary then heads west onto Adelaide Terrace to the Hodgkin Park Road junction and continues north to the rear of the allotment gardens and Lismore Place. The boundary moves to the west behind Denhill Park properties to Pendower Hall School and follows the school's eastern perimeter north to the West Road to the A1.

Education
The ward has two nursery schools, six primary schools, one comprehensive secondary school and a school for children with specific needs.

Recreation and leisure

The ward has both the West End Library and Denton Burn Library, which have computers with free internet access. The West End library holds the West Newcastle Picture History Collection of around 17,000 images of the West End, some taken by Jimmy Forsyth. Benwell Nature Park and Denton Dene South are located within the ward. Scotswood Leisure Centre hosts various sports clubs and fitness classes. The ward contains three pieces of Play Provision, provided by Newcastle Play Service.

These are the Lillia Play Sessions, held at the Lillia Youth Centre and two playcentres: Scotswood Playcentre and Benwell Playcentre. These provide free open access sessions five days a week to children 5–12 (older children with disabilities and additional needs are also welcome).

Scotswood Natural Community garden was awarded a Green Flag Community Award.  In 2012 a Sculpture Trail was created which involved the creation of four sculptures by artists working with local community groups.

West End RFC is a local amateur rugby club which plays its home matches at All Saints Sports Centre.

Charts

The ward has 6,411 housing spaces, 6.4% being vacant, higher than the city average of 5.3%. Owner-occupied properties stand at 46.9%, also lower than the city average of 53.3%. The properties are as follows:

References

External links
 Newcastle Council Ward Info: Benwell and Scotswood
 Newcastle Council 2001 census

Districts of Newcastle upon Tyne
Wards of Newcastle upon Tyne